The canton of Redon is an administrative division of the Ille-et-Vilaine department, in northwestern France. At the French canton reorganisation which came into effect in March 2015, it was expanded from 6 to 15 communes. Its seat is in Redon.

It consists of the following communes: 
 
Bains-sur-Oust 
Bruc-sur-Aff
La Chapelle-de-Brain
Guipry-Messac
Langon
Lieuron
Lohéac
Pipriac
Redon
Renac
Sainte-Marie
Saint-Ganton
Saint-Just
Saint-Malo-de-Phily
Sixt-sur-Aff

References

Cantons of Ille-et-Vilaine